Andrea Šebestová (born March 16, 1978 in Plzeň) is a Czech rhythmic gymnast.

Šebestová competed for the Czech Republic in the rhythmic gymnastics individual all-around competition at the 1996 Summer Olympics in Atlanta. There she was 28th in the qualification round and did not advance to the semifinal.

References

External links 
 
 

1978 births
Living people
Czech rhythmic gymnasts
Gymnasts at the 1996 Summer Olympics
Olympic gymnasts of the Czech Republic
Sportspeople from Plzeň